Sheep Hill can refer to one of a number of places:

 Sheep Hill, United Kingdom - a village
 Sheep Hill, South Australia - a proposed port